= Devalingikoppa =

- Nickname: "Jodalli"
- Country: India
- State: Karnataka
- District: Dharwad

Population (2011)
  - Total: 1,864

Languages
  - Official: Kannada
- Time zone: UTC+5:30 (IST)
- ISO 3166 code: IN-KA
- Vehicle registration: KA
- Website: karnataka.gov.in

Devalingikoppa is a village in Dharwad district of Karnataka, India.

== Demographics ==
As of the 2011 Census of India there were 367 households in Devalingikoppa and a total population of 1,864, consisting of 957 males and 907 females. There were 254 children ages 0-6.
